The Journal of Electromagnetic Waves and Applications is a peer-reviewed scientific journal published by Taylor & Francis in 18 issues per year. It covers electromagnetic wave theory and its applications, including but not limited to wave propagation, antenna theory, photonics, and electromagnetic compatibility. The editors-in-chief are Pankaj Kumar Choudhury (National University of Malaysia) and Mohamad Abou El-Nasr (Arab Academy for Science, Technology & Maritime Transport). The founding editor-in-chief of the journal was Jin Au Kong.

Abstracting and indexing
The journal is abstracted and indexed in:
Current Contents/Engineering, Computing & Technology
EBSCO databases
Ei Compendex
Inspec
Science Citation Index Expanded
Scopus
Zentralblatt MATH
According to the Journal Citation Reports, the journal has a 2021 impact factor of 1.438.

References

External links

Optics journals

English-language journals
Journals published between 13 and 25 times per year
Taylor & Francis academic journals
Publications established in 1987
Electromagnetism journals